Vavra or Vávra is a Czech-language surname.

Vavra may also refer to:

Vávra, Vavřa, a diminutive of the Czech name Vavřinec, a Czech calque of the name Laurentius
Vávra Suk, Swedish politician
3732 Vávra, main-belt asteroid